Samuel Blackwell Chilton (May 27, 1900 - December 26, 1984) was a suffragan bishop of the Episcopal Diocese of Virginia, serving from 1960 to 1969.

Early life and education
Chilton was born on May 27, 1900, in Remington, Virginia, the son of Charles Blackwell Chilton and Harriet Whiting Scott Glassell Hamilton. He studied at the Virginia Polytechnic Institute between 1918 and 1920 and the at the University of Virginia from where he graduated with a Bachelor of Arts in 1921. He also studied at the Virginia Theological Seminary and graduated in 1924 with a Bachelor of Divinity. He married Harriet Harrington McMillan on September 3, 1925, and together had three children. He was awarded a Doctor of Divinity in 1957.

Ordained Ministry
In June 1924, Chilton was ordained deacon and became deacon-in-charge of St Paul's Church in Hanover, Virginia. A year later, in June 1925, he was ordained priest by Bishop William Cabell Brown of Virginia. He was appointed rector of the same church in 1925 and served there till 1941. He also served as rector St Peter's Church in Talleysville, Virginia from 1928 till 1938. From 1941 to 1954, he served as secretary-treasurer of the Diocese of Virginia, and then in 1954 became the Archdeacon of Virginia, a post he retained till 1960.

Bishop
Chilton was elected Suffragan Bishop of Virginia in January 1960 on the third ballot. He was consecrated on May 12, 1960, at Grace and Holy Trinity Church in Richmond, Virginia by Presiding Bishop Arthur C. Lichtenberger. He retained his post till 1969. He died at Alexandria Hospital after a stroke on December 26, 1984.

References

1900 births
1984 deaths
20th-century American Episcopalians
Episcopal bishops of Virginia
20th-century American clergy